Kevin M. McCarthy (born June 29, 1971) is an American Democratic legislator who served in the Iowa House of Representatives from 2003 until 2013 and, for his last two years there, was the House Minority Leader. McCarthy was born, raised, and resides in Des Moines, Iowa. He received his B.A. from Wartburg College and his J.D. from Drake University.

The son of former Des Moines Police Chief and former Polk County Sheriff Bill McCarthy, he resigned in August 2013 to take a position with the Iowa Attorney General's office.

Electoral history
*incumbent

References

External links

 Representative Kevin McCarthy official Iowa General Assembly site
 House Majority Leader State Representative Kevin McCarthy official constituency site
 
 Financial information (state office) at the National Institute for Money in State Politics

1971 births
Living people
Politicians from Des Moines, Iowa
Democratic Party members of the Iowa House of Representatives
Wartburg College alumni
Drake University Law School alumni